Carlo Belli (Rovereto, Italy December 6, 1903 – Rome, Italy March 16, 1991) was an Italian art critic, theorist, and writer.

Life 
Carlo Belli was born in the city of Rovereto on December 6, 1903 to Arturo Belli, a bank worker who had a passion for music, and Luigia Fait Belli. Now a part of Italy, in the north eastern region of Trentino–Alto Adige, the city was part of Austria when Belli was born (before WWI ). Belli's uncle (on his mother's side) was sculptor Carlo Fait and his cousin (on his mother's side) was Fausto Melotti. During WWI, Belli went with Melotti and his parents to Florence until 1919, when he returned to Rovereto to finish his schooling. 

Belli died in Rome on March 16, 1991.

Work 
Belli was an Italian intellectual who wrote about art, music, architecture, archaeology, and politics. He also made a number of drawings and collages throughout his career.

In Rovereto after WWI, Belli met Futurist artists like Fortunato Depero. Throughout the 1920s, Belli published on art and literature in regional and national publications. Belli traveled to Berlin with architect Luciano Baldessari in 1924 where he began to formulate his ideas about art that would culminate in his publication of Kn in 1935. In 1925, he traveled to the Bauhaus in Dessau where he first met Kandinskij. He became a member of the Fascist Party in 1928 and was given the official designation of art critic for the Brenner region. Moving to Brescia, outside Milan, that same year, he gained the position of art critical at the newspaper "Il Popolo di Brescia". In 1932, he began his work with the Galleria il Milione in Milan, which supported the work of abstract artists. Milione published the first edition of Kn. In 1934, Belli moved to Rome to document the artistic happenings and trends. Belli visited Paris in 1937, just before WWII broke out. He traveled with the Ghiringhelli brothers (they owned Il Milione), the architect Alberto Sartoris, and Melotti. In Paris, they met with Kandinskiy. He returned to Rome in 1939, but left again in 1942 because of WWII.

After WWII, he continue to publish, working for papers like "Il Giornale" and "Il Tempo".

In 1998, an exhibition was held to investigate his impact on the arts culture in Rome at the Palazzo delle esposizioni. His archive is now house at the Museo di arte moderna e contemporanea di Trento e Rovereto within the Archivio dell'900 (or 20th century archive).

Publications 

 Kn. Milan: Edizioni del Milione. 1935 (reprinted: 1972 & 88 Vanni Scheiwiller & 2006 Nayelli Zabaleta Solís & 2016 Giometti & Antonello)

References

External links 

 ARCHIVIO CARLO BELLI - http://cim.mart.tn.it/cim/pages/archivio.jsp?aid=224

Italian art critics

1903 births
1991 deaths